The Wisconsin Badgers women's ice hockey team represented the University of Wisconsin. The team finished the season by winning the school's fourth NCAA Women's Ice Hockey Championship. Senior captain, Meghan Duggan, was awarded the 2011 Patty Kazmaier Award.

Offseason
 September 28: In the USA Today/USA Hockey Magazine Women's College Hockey Poll, the Badgers have been voted as the pre-season Number 5.

News and notes
 October 2: Hilary Knight had a five-point game in a 6–0 victory over RPI. She had a natural hat trick to start the game and then had two assists.
 Carolyne Prevost had a four-goal series (two game-winners, a shorthanded goal, a power-play goal) as the Badgers swept Bemidji State in their league-opening series. She led the Badgers with a hat trick, including the game-winning goal, in a 7–1 victory over the Beavers in the first game. It was her second career hat trick as a Badger. In the second game (Oct 10), she had her second straight game-winning goal as the Badgers won 2–0. Prevost currently leads the nation with three game-winning goals in four games.
 Brittany Ammerman had two points (one goal, one assist) as Wisconsin swept rival Minnesota State. She scored Wisconsin's second goal of the game in a 3–2 win on October 29. Her older sister Brooke Ammerman assisted on the goal. She would get an assist in Wisconsin's final goal in the October 30th triumph. Ammerman finished the series with a +2 plus/minus rating.
December 10–11: Brooke Ammerman led her team with six scoring points and was named the No. 1 star of both games as the Badgers swept league rival St. Cloud State. She tallied three goals and three assists, with three of her six points coming on the power-play. In addition, she recorded her second hat trick of the season and added one assist for four points in the December 11, 6–1 win over St. Cloud. Her hat trick included two powerplay goals and the game-winner. On December 10, Ammerman set up Madison Packer's goal at 10:02 of the first period to give the Badgers a 2–0 lead and followed up with another helper just 2:34 later. As of December 15, Ammerman is tied for the national lead with six power-play goals on the season. Her six points tied her career-high for a single series. Through 18 games played this season, Ammerman has produced 24 points on 10 goals and 14 assists.
 On December 10, Alex Rigsby earned her third collegiate shutout in a conference road victory at St. Cloud State. She improved her won-loss record to 11–1–0. At 11–1–0, Rigsby's .917 winning percentage tops the WCHA and is fourth in the nation. She also ranks third in the WCHA with a 1.86 goals-against average and is fifth in the league with a .919 save percentage.
January 14 and 16:  Hilary Knight produced eight scoring points while leading the Badgers to a two-game sweep of St. Cloud State. Knight accumulated five points on three goals and two assists in the January 14th 10–0 win. On the 16th, she had two more goals and one assist for three points as the Badgers won by a 6–0 mark. Of her five goals, two were scored on the power play, and one of the goals on January 14 was the game winner. With the sweep, the Badgers increased their winning streak to 10 straight games. Knight is the top goal scorer in Div. 1 women's hockey this season with 31.
Jan 21–22: Wisconsin right winter Meghan Duggan led the top-ranked Badgers with four scoring points in a win and tie at defending national champion Minnesota Duluth. Duggan registered two goals and two assists against the Bulldogs, recorded nine shots on goal and finished with a +4 plus/minus rating in the two games. She led all players with three points in the January 21 win (4–1). She scored the Badgers first goal of the game (it was the first women's college hockey goal scored at the Bulldogs new AMSOIL Arena). In the second period, she assisted on a power-play tally to give Wisconsin a 3–0 lead. In the final two minutes, she had an empty net goal. The following day, both clubs skated to a 4–4 tie (Wisconsin prevailed 2–1 in the shootout). Duggan assisted on the Badgers’ second goal of the game and extended her current point streak to 22 games, the longest individual point streak in Wisconsin women's hockey history. On January 21, she broke the previous mark of 20 games set by Meghan Hunter from Oct. 14, 2000 to Jan. 12, 2001.
January 28–29: Alex Rigsby made a combined 50 saves and allowed three goals as the top-ranked Badgers earned a tie and victory against Minnesota. She 23 saves on January 28 in a 2–2 overtime tie. The following day, she made 27 saves while earning her 17th victory of the season. The match was played before a women's college hockey record crowd of 10,668. Over the two game period, she had a .943 saves percentage and had four shutout periods, including the one 5:00 overtime segment. She is now unbeaten in her last 11 games and her .900 winning percentage leads the WCHA. Her 1.95 GAA is first in the WCHA.
February 5: Hilary Knight scored her 36th goal of the year at 2:46 in the overtime period as Wisconsin defeated the Bemidji State Beavers by a 3–2 mark at the Sanford Center.  Bemidji State goalie Alana McElhinney made 43 saves on the night including 24 in the second period.
In front of 3,783 fans at the Kohl Center on February 12, ten Badgers recorded points as the Badgers defeated North Dakota by an 8–4 mark. The game marked the final regular season game for seniors Mallory Deluce, Anne Dronen, Meghan Duggan, Kelly Nash, Carla Pentimone  and Geena Prough.
March 20: The Wisconsin Badgers bested the Boston University Terriers by a 4–1 mark to claim the 2011 NCAA Frozen Four. Wisconsin finished the championship season on a 27-game unbeaten streak, posting a 25–0–2 record since losing to WCHA rival Minnesota Duluth on November 28, 2010. The Frozen Four match marked the first meeting between Wisconsin and Boston University in women's hockey history. The match marked the Badgers 37th win of the season. It set a record for the most wins in a single season in NCAA women's hockey history. The previous mark of 36 wins was set by three teams: Minnesota (36–2–2) in 2005; Wisconsin (36–4–1) in 2006; Wisconsin (36–1–4) in 2007.
May 9: The official groundbreaking ceremony for Le Bahn Arena took place. The arena will serve as the new women's ice hockey game and practice facility, and host the new men's ice hockey practice facility.
May 20: The city of Sun Valley, Idaho declared May 19, 2011 as Hilary Knight Day.

Regular season

Standings

Schedule and results
  Green background indicates win (3 points).
  Yellow background indicates shootout win (2 points).
  Red background indicates loss (0 points).
  White background indicates tie (1 point).

Awards and honors
 Brittany Ammerman, WCHA Rookie of the Week (Week of November 3, 2010)
 Brooke Ammerman, WCHA Offensive Player of the Week (Week of December 15)
 Meghan Duggan, WCHA Offensive Player of the Week (Week of January 26, 2011)
Meghan Duggan, WCHA Offensive Player of the Week (Week of February 16, 2011)
 Anne Dronen, WCHA Defensive Player of the Week (Week of January 5)
 Hilary Knight, WCHA Offensive Player of the Week (Week of October 5)
Hilary Knight, WCHA Offensive Player of the Week (Week of January 5)
Hilary Knight, WCHA Offensive Player of the Week (Week of January 19, 2011) 
 Madison Packer, WCHA Rookie of the Week (Week of January 5)
 Madison Packer, WCHA Rookie of the Week (Week of February 23)
 Carolyne Prevost, WCHA Offensive Player of the Week (Week of October 12)
Carolyne Prevost, Capital One Academic All-District honors (Academic All-District 5 Second Team)
 Alex Rigsby, WCHA Defensive Player of the Week (Week of December 15)  
Alex Rigsby, WCHA Rookie of the Week (Week of February 2, 2011)
Becca Ruegsegger, Capital One Academic All-District honors (Academic All-District 5 First Team)

Postseason honors
Brianna Decker, All-WCHA First Team (2010–11)
Brianna Decker, WCHA Final Face-off Most Valuable Player (2010–11) 
Meghan Duggan, WCHA Player of the Year
Meghan Duggan, WCHA scoring champion
Meghan Duggan, 2011 Patty Kazmaier Award Winner
Meghan Duggan and Hillary Knight, shared Frozen Four MVP honors
Meghan Duggan, 2011 Big Ten Outstanding Sportsmanship Award
Meghan Duggan, 2011 Bob Allen Women's Player of the Year, awarded by USA Hockey
Mark Johnson, WCHA Coach of the Year
Mark Johnson, Finalist, 2011 AHCA Women's Ice Hockey Division I Coach of the Year
Becca Ruegsegger, NCAA Elite 88 Award

Frozen Four All-Tournament team
Forward: Brooke Ammerman, Wisconsin
Forward: Meghan Duggan, Wisconsin
Forward: Carolyne Prevost, Wisconsin
Defense: Alev Kelter, Wisconsin

All-Americans
Brianna Decker, 2011 Second Team All-America
Meghan Duggan, 2011 First Team All-America
Hilary Knight, 2011 First Team All-America

Team awards
Brianna Decker, Top student-athlete award (female)
Carla Pentimone, Community service award
Carolyne Prevost, Chi Alpha Sigma Student-Athlete Honor Society inductee
Brittany Haverstock, Wisconsin Performance award (one of 10 student athletes who won)
Becca Ruegsegger, 4.0 recognition award

CWHL draft picks
The following Badgers (including alumni) were selected in the 2011 CWHL Draft.

See also
2010-11 Wisconsin Badgers men's ice hockey season

References

W
W
Wisconsin Badgers women's ice hockey seasons
NCAA women's ice hockey Frozen Four seasons
NCAA women's ice hockey championship seasons
Wiscon
Wiscon